is a Japanese company which focuses on correspondence education and publishing. Based in Okayama-City, it is the parent company of Berlitz Language Schools, which in turn is the parent company of ELS Language Centers. Benesse is listed on the Tokyo Stock Exchange (listing code 9783).

Origin of the company name
The company name is derived from the Latin words "bene" (well) and "esse" (being).

Company history
In 1986, Soichiro Fukutake succeeded his father as President on the latter's death. In 1994, the company completed the construction of the Fukutake Shoten Tokyo Building (now Benesse Corporation Tokyo Building) in Tama-City, Tokyo. In April 1995, the company was renamed Benesse Corporation.

A major breakthrough in the company's history was the acquisition of a majority stake in Berlitz Language Schools, which had gone public in 1989. In 2001, Benesse completed the take-over by acquiring 100% ownership of Berlitz and making it a private company once again.

Benesse Foundation
The Benesse House is a 10-room hotel located inside a contemporary art museum on the island of Naoshima in the Seto Inland Sea. Built in 1992, it is the only hotel on the island and was designed in partnership with architect Tadao Ando. It was built by the Benesse Foundation which is funded by the Benesse Corporation.

Franchises
Benesse is the originator of the Kodomo Challenge educational program, which debuted in April 1988 and introduced three young-animal mascot characters: Shimajiro the tiger, Torippi/Flappy the parrot, and Ramurin the lamb. These characters, along with later 1991 addition Mimirin/Mimi-Lynne the rabbit, would appear in a long-running series of Shimajiro anime starting in 1993.

Notes

References

External links 
 Benesse Corporation
 ELS official site

 
Education companies established in 1955
Book publishing companies of Japan
Companies based in Okayama Prefecture
Publishing companies established in 1955
Mass media in Okayama
Companies listed on the Tokyo Stock Exchange
Holding companies of Japan
Japanese companies established in 1955
Holding companies established in 1955